The Running Water Stage Station Site, near Marsland in Box Butte County, Nebraska, is an archeological site that was listed on the National Register of Historic Places in 1975.  It is known as, or within, the Hughes Ranch.

It is the site of a waystation on the Sidney Black Hills Stage Road, in operation 1874 to the mid-1880s.

References

External links
, includes photo of site

Archaeological sites on the National Register of Historic Places in Nebraska
Buildings and structures completed in 1874
Buildings and structures in Box Butte County, Nebraska
National Register of Historic Places in Box Butte County, Nebraska
Stagecoach stations on the National Register of Historic Places
Stagecoach stations in Nebraska
Transportation buildings and structures on the National Register of Historic Places in Nebraska